Regenerating islet-derived protein 3 alpha (or Regenerating islet-derived protein III-alpha) formerly known as HIP/PAP (Hepatocarcinoma-Intestine-Pancreas/Pancreatitis-Associated Protein) and peptide 23 is a protein that in humans is encoded by the REG3A gene.

This gene encodes a pancreatic secretory protein that may be involved in cell proliferation or differentiation. It has similarity to the C-type lectin superfamily. The enhanced expression of this gene is observed during pancreatic inflammation and liver carcinogenesis. Multiple alternatively spliced transcript variants encoding the same protein have been described for this gene but the full length nature of some transcripts is not yet known.

Reg3A (UniProt Q0614 1) is a bactericidal C-type lectin that is constitutively produced in the intestine that has antibacterial properties against Gram-positive bacteria. Bacterial killing is mediated by binding to surface-exposed carbohydrate moieties of bacterial peptidoglycan and executed by the formation of a hexameric pore in the membrane.

References

Further reading